Amantani is one of fifteen districts of the Puno Province in the Puno region, Peru.

History 
Amantani District was created by Law on April 9, 1965, in Fernando Belaúnde term.

Ethnic groups 
The people in the district are mainly indigenous citizens of Quechua descent. Quechua is the language which the majority of the population (95.28%) learnt to speak in childhood, 1.50% of the residents started speaking using the Spanish language (2007 Peru Census).

Mayors 
 2011-2014: Marcelino Yucra Pacompia.
 2007-2010: Adrián Severo Yanarico Cari.

Festivities 
 Our Lady of Candles.

See also 
 Amantani

References

External links
  Official district web site
  INEI Peru